Storsnasen is a mountain peak in the Snasahögarna mountain range of Jämtland County, western Sweden. Panoramic views of Lake Ånnsjön, which lies to the northeast, can be seen from the summit. The Storulvåns mountain station is to the south.

References

Mountains of Sweden
Landforms of Jämtland County